Golan Front is a 1985 video game published by Simulations Canada.

Gameplay
Golan Front is a computer wargame in which the battle fought by Israel against Egypt, Syria, Iraq, and Jordan in the Golan Heights is simulated. It features elements of board wargaming, such as counters and a physical map, in addition to computer play.

Reception
William H. Harrington reviewed the game for Computer Gaming World, and stated that "GF is a first rate military simulation." Commodore Microcomputers named it one of the top computer wargames of 1986.

References

External links

Review in Tilt

1985 video games
Apple II games
Commodore 64 games
Computer wargames
Mass media about the Arab–Israeli conflict
Simulations Canada video games
Turn-based strategy video games
Video games developed in Canada
Video games set in 1973
Video games set in Israel
Video games set in Syria
Yom Kippur War